Face Candy was an American improvisational jazz rap group by led rapper Eyedea in Saint Paul, Minnesota. The group released one album, This Is Where We Were, in 2006. The initial lineup on the album consisted of Eyedea, Kristoff Krane, J.T. Bates, and Casey O'Brien until Eyedea's sudden death in 2010. The group released a second album second album in 2011, Waste Age Teenland.

History

Eyedea & Friends 
Formed in 2005 as Eyedea & Friends the group originally consisted of well known freestyle battle champion and underground rapper Eyedea with drummer J.T. Bates, (also of Eyedea's rock band Carbon Carousel), bassist Casey O'Brien, and local rappers Kristoff Krane (also of Abzorber), Carnage, and Mazta I. The group started playing shows at local hip-hop oriented venues where much of the audience which showed up was expecting the music be similar to Eyedea's solo work and work as part of Eyedea & Abilities. However the Eyedea and Friends show's actually consisted entirely of extended freestyles with freely improvised instrumental backing this lend to disappointment and anger in many of the fans who in turn booed and threw objects at the group. After the first tour the group stopped performing for a while due partly to the negative reaction. However the project was revived with the new name Face Candy and found a better reaction to the music playing now that fans knew what to expect and through playing Jazz venues where the crowds were more receptive to the group's sound.

This Is Where We Were (2005) 
This Is Where We Were was recorded live in 2005 while the group was touring the American Midwest. The album was released on November 21, 2006.

Change in lineup 
Carnage and Mazta I left in 2006 reducing the group to a four-man line up they continued to perform and record new material. Eyedea died in his sleep on October 16, 2010 due to an overdose.

Waste Age Teenland (2011) 
In mid 2011, it was confirmed the second album Waste Age Teenland would be released posthumously by Rhymesayers. This album was recorded in two days at the Winterland studios and one night in front of an audience at Black Dog Cafe in Saint Paul. It was released May 24, 2011, seven months after Eyedea's death.

Members
The band had several lineups.

Initial members
Eyedea (deceased) – Vocals
Carnage – Vocals, Human percussion
Mazta I – Vocals

Later members 
Kristoff Krane – Vocals
J.T. Bates – Drums
Casey O'Brien – Bass

Discography
This Is Where We Were (2006)
Waste Age Teenland (2011)

References 

American hip hop groups
American jazz ensembles from Minnesota
Rhymesayers Entertainment artists